John Carlyle Balfanz (June 23, 1940 – November 11, 1991) was an American ski jumper. He competed in the 1964 and 1968 Winter Olympics with the best result of 10th place in the normal hill in 1964.

Balfanz took up ski jumping aged six, and by age 15 won the Central US Junior Championships. In 1957–1959 he served in the U.S. Army, first at Fort Carson in the U.S. and then in Karlsruhe, Germany. He took part in the 1962 World Championships in Poland, and in 17 international meets in Europe in 1963, winning two, and placing second at the Holmenkollen Ski Festival. In 1965 he set a U.S. national record at 325 feet (99 m) at Iron Mountain, Michigan. Balfanz retired from competitions after the 1968 Olympics, and later worked a national jumping coach. In 1980 he was inducted into the American Ski Jumping Hall of Fame.

References

1940 births
1991 deaths
American male ski jumpers
Olympic ski jumpers of the United States
Ski jumpers at the 1964 Winter Olympics
Ski jumpers at the 1968 Winter Olympics
Sportspeople from Minneapolis